Hemmet is a small town in the former Egvad Municipality (Danish: Egvad kommune), which since 1 January 2007 has been part of the Ringkøbing-Skjern Municipality, Midtjylland, near the west coast of Jutland in Denmark. Hemmet has a town population of 334. The word "Hemmet" derives from prior Danish, meaning "The home".

Education
In the early 1990s, the town of Hemmet had a school, but it was abolished since it was deemed too small. Afterwards, pupils from Hemmet had to attend the private Christian school in Sønder Vium, 4 km east of Hemmet or the public school 5 km south of Hemmet located in Nørre Bork, where the "Bork Havn Musikfestival" is staged.  In Hemmet there is a kindergarten, holding around 100 pupils

Nearby schools
 Sdr. Vium Friskole
 Bork Skole
 Tarm Skole - Overbygningen
 Tarm Skole - Byskolen

Events
Hemmet has its own harbor, which is about 1000 m² large. At the harbor, each summer a havnefest (harbour feast) is held.

The town has a football team playing in the 6th series of Danish football. It shares its name with the nearby city of Sønder Vium, which Hemmet also bonds with. The football team is called "HSV IF", formerly "HSV '82".

Religion
Hemmet has a church, which is known by many Christians in the area, because of the priest Martin Jensen. He is known because of his inner mission way of speaking. Not all citizens in Hemmet are Christians though.

Sources

External links
Hemmet's own homepage 
Hemmet parish 

Cities and towns in the Central Denmark Region